Rufat Atakishi oglu Quliyev, known as Rufet Guliyev, was born in Baku on May 6, 1963. He was elected as a deputy of the National Assembly of Azerbaijan (Milli Majlis) on the III, IV, V and VI convening's, and nowadays he is a member of the Committee on Economic Policy, a vice-chairman of the Permanent Commission of the IPA CIS on Political Issues and International Cooperation, a member of the Working group on culture, science and education of GUAM, Dr. of Economics, Professor, head of an academic department in Azerbaijan Technical University, professor of Taras Shevchenko National University of Kyiv. He is a member in Council of experts of the Economy section of the Higher Attestation Commission under the President of Azerbaijan and recently has been selected as a Member of the Expert Council on Economics at the CIS Inter-parliamentary Assembly.

Biography
Guliyev entered the Economics Department of Kyiv State University (now, Taras Shevchenko National University of Kyiv) in 1981 and graduated from it in 1986. The same year he began pedagogical activity in the Azerbaijan Technical University (former Azerbaijan Polytechnical Institute).
He worked as a chief laboratory worker, lecturer, senior lecturer, docent and a professor at the University.

Since 1995 Guliyev is a candidate of philosophy in economy and since 2004 he is a Doctor of economics. Since 2006 he is a Professor of the Azerbaijan Technical University. Nowadays, Guliyev is the head of the "Economic theory and economy of service areas" academic department at the University.

He is the author of nearly 300 scientific works and articles (which include 7 monographs, 4 study books, 3 brochures), 41 of which were published in authoritative scientific magazines of the US, Turkey, Russia, Ukraine, Czech Republic, Slovakia, Latvia, Estonia, Kazakhstan, Sweden and other countries. He is an active participator of local and international scientific conferences, forums and seminars. He continuously participated in symposiums in Nice, London, Kiev, and also produced fundamental speeches on development ways of Azeri economy and achieved successes at conferences, held by Azeri government in Great Britain, Russia, Ukraine, Italy, Public Republic of China, Kuwait, Germany, Northern Cyprus, Latvia, Moldova, Kazakhstan and the UAE.

Since 1999 until 2017 Guliyev was a chairperson of the Executive Board of the "European Tobacco-Baku". Since 2003, Guliyev is a member of Board of Trustees of the Azerbaijan Export and Investment Promotion Foundation. He is a co-chairperson of the Azerbaijan-Turkey Businessmen Union.

Guliyev is the head of the working group on Azerbaijan-Ukraine interparliamentary relations and a member of the working groups on 
Azerbaijan-Italy, Azerbaijan-India, Azerbaijan-Denmark interparliamentary relations. He was in many foreign trips via Milli Majlis and the IPA CIS, participated as an observer in most of the presidential and parliamentary elections organized in CIA countries and works purposefully and effectively in direction of delivering Azeri realities to the world community.

He was awarded with the "For specific merits in defending workers' social-economic rights and interests" medal by Confederation of 
Trade Unions of Azerbaijan, the emeritus anniversary medal dedicated to 60 years of UN by International Human Rights Defence Committee, 
the emeritus medal by International Human Rights Defence Committee of Ministry of Justice of Ukraine, the emeritus anniversary medal dedicated to 20 years of CIS, three emeritus medals of Taras Shevchenko National University of Kyiv, the "Birimdik-Yedinstvo" order of "Birimdik-Yedinstvo" public foundation of Kyrgyzstan.

He participates actively in charity events.

He is nonpartisan.

Guliyev speaks Azerbaijani, Russian and English fluently.

He is married and has two children.

Scientific researches
Rufat Guliyev's theses are:

a) "Evolution of efficient usage factors of production funds in terms of transition towards market (on industry materials of Azerbaijan Republic)" - thesis for the degree of candidate of Economic Sciences. It was defended on May 16, 1995 on Academic Council of the Institute of National Economy (called Azerbaijan State Economic University nowadays) under speciality 08.00.01 (Economic theory).

b) "Investment problems of shaping of national economy of Azerbaijan" - thesis for the degree of Doctor of Economic Sciences. It was defended on February 20, 2004 on Academic Council of the Institute of Economy of Azerbaijan National Academy of Sciences under speciality 08.00.01 (Economic theory).

See also

National Assembly
Government of Azerbaijan

References

Links 
 Official YouTube channel
 Феномен глобализации и Азербайджан
 Мировой кризис и экономика Азербайджана
 В Азербайджане будут созданы еще более благоприятные условия для бизнеса
 Налоговая политика в некоторых странах мира: анализ и сравнение
 Современные экономические теории и модели социально-экономического развития
 НОВАЯ СИТУАЦИЯ - Об экономической политике Азербайджана в постнефтяной период
 Международные наблюдатели положительно оценили выборы в Санкт-Петербурге
 Oqtay Esedov deputatlarla birge Rusiya gedir 
 Azərbaycanlı deputat Kiyevdə “erməni soyqırımı”ını müzakirə etdi
 Deputat Rüfət Quliyev daimi komissiyanın sədr müavini seçilib
 Deputat Rüfət Quliyev Astanada Qələbənin 70 illiyi münasibətilə keçiriləcək tədbirdə iştirak edəcək
 Rüfət Quliyev: Avropa Azərbaycanla münasibətlərdən çox fayda qazanacaq
 SEMIMI RESMIYYET- Millet vekili Rufet Quliyev
 Rüfət Quliyev: Sahibkarlar kənd təsərrüfatı sahəsində onlara yaradılan şəraitdən yararlanmalıdırlar
 Rüfət Quliyev: "Ölkəmiz artıq investisiya edən ölkəyə çevrilib"
 Sosiologiya: nəzəriyyə və tədqiqat metodologiyası
 I Avropa Oyunları xidmət sektoru üçün imtahandır
 Deputat Rüfət Quliyev : “ Avropa qurumları Azərbaycanın qərarını düzgün qiymətləndirdi”
 Руфат Атакиши оглу Гулиев; Сильная экономика, могущественное государство, благополучная жизнь
 Наблюдатель из Азербайджана отмечает отсутствие погрешностей на избирательных участках в Беларуси
 Руфат Гулиев о выборах в Беларуси
 ВЫБОРЫ-2015. Руфат Гулиев – наблюдатель из Азербайджана – рассказал об обстановке на выборах-2015
 Привлечь туристов из СНГ легче, чем из Европы - МНЕНИЕ
 Azərbaycan parlament nümayəndə heyəti Belarusda prezident seçkilərini müşahidə edəcək
 Deputatlığa namizəd Rüfət Quliyev seçki platformasını açıqlayıb
 Rüfət Quliyev seçicilərlə görüşüb
 Rüfət Quliyev: “Seçicilərimin mənə etimad göstərəcəyinə inanıram”
 Deputat namizəd Rüfət Quliyev 5 ildəki xarici səfərləri barədə seçicilərə hesabat verib - FOTOSESSİYA
 Rüfət Quliyev “Bosco Conference”in açılışını edib - FOTO
 Rüfət Quliyev növbəti dəfə seçiciləri ilə görüşüb
 В Азербайджане будут созданы еще более благоприятные условия для бизнеса
 Новая ситуация - Об экономической политике Азербайджана в постнефтяной период
 В Азербайджане может появиться альтернатива льготным кредитам
 Руфат Гулиев: Реформы в Азербайджане, в отличие от Европы, носят систематический характер
 В Азербайджане предлагается ввести госконтроль за деятельностью ломбардов
 Депутаты поддерживают инициативу главы государства
 Политика Президента Ильхама Алиева направлена на ускорение развития экономики Азербайджана
 Как выход Великобритании из ЕС повлияет на Азербайджан - ПОДРОБНО
 Как BREXIT повлияет на курс маната - ПОДРОБНОСТИ
 Международные наблюдатели проверили готовность Петербурга к выборам
 Международные наблюдатели начали работу на избирательных участках Петербурга
 На выборах в Петербурге работают 12 наблюдателей от МПА СНГ
 Миссия МПА СНГ: выборы в Петербурге соответствуют международным стандартам
 Прямое включение: Международные наблюдатели отметили положительные изменения избирательной системы России
 Прямое включение: Явка на выборы в ЗакС на 12:00 составила почти 6%
 Политическая палитра Петербурга: предварительные итоги выборов в Госдуму и Законодательное собрание
 Deputat Rüfət Quliyev: “Rusiya Dövlət Dumasına seçkilər şəffaf keçirilib” – FOTOLAR
 Deputat Rüfət Quliyev: “Rusiya Dövlət Dumasına seçkilər şəffaf keçib”
 Deputat Rüfət Quliyev: “Rusiya Dövlət Dumasına seçkilər şəffaf keçib”
 Rüfət Quliyev: “Rusiya Dövlət Dumasına seçkilər şəffaf keçirilib”
 Deputat Rüfət Quliyev:“Rusiya Dövlət Dumasına seçkilər şəffaf keçib”
 “Rusiya Dövlət Dumasına seçkilər şəffaf keçib” - Deputat Rüfət Quliyev
 Deputat:“Rusiya Dövlət Dumasına seçkilər şəffaf keçib” 
 Dumaya seçkilər şəffaf keçdi - Millət vəkili
 Milli Məclisin deputatı: Rusiya Dövlət Dumasına seçkilər şəffaf keçirilib
 DEPUTAT RÜFƏT QULIYEV:“RUSIYA DÖVLƏT DUMASINA SEÇKILƏR ŞƏFFAF KEÇIB”
 Milli Məclisin deputatı: Rusiya Dövlət Dumasına seçkilər şəffaf keçirilib
 Milli Məclisin deputatı: Rusiya Dövlət Dumasına seçkilər şəffaf keçirilib
 Deputat:“Rusiya Dövlət Dumasına seçkilər şəffaf keçib”
 Deputat Rüfət Quliyev: “Rusiya Dövlət Dumasına seçkilər şəffaf keçib”
 Dumaya seckiler seffaf kecdi – Millet vekili
 Deputat Rüfət Quliyev Sankt-Peterburqda RAGT fəalları ilə görüşüb – FOTOLAR
 DEPUTAT RÜFƏT QULIYEV SANKT-PETERBURQ ŞƏHƏRINDƏ RUSIYANIN AZƏRBAYCANLI GƏNCLƏR TƏŞKILATININ ( RAGT) FƏALLARI ILƏ GÖRÜŞÜB
 Sankt-Peterburqda Rusiyanın Azərbaycanlı Gənclər Təşkilatının fəalları ilə görüş keçirilib
 Sankt-Peterburqda konstitusiya dəyişikliyi ilə bağlı tədbir keçirilib
 Sankt-Peterburqda “Azərbaycanda Konstitusiya islahatları” mövzusunda dəyirmi masa keçirilib
 Sankt-Peterburqda Rusiyanın Azərbaycanlı Gənclər Təşkilatının fəalları ilə görüş keçirilib
 Sankt-Peterburqda “Azərbaycanda Konstitusiya islahatları” mövzusunda dəyirmi masa keçirilib 
 Millət vəkili Sankt-Peterburqda RAGT fəalları ilə görüşüb
 Millət vəkilləri “AMOR”-un tədbirində-Fotolar
 Referendum Rusiyadakı azərbaycanlı gənclərlə müzakirə edilib FOTO
 Referendum Rusiyadakı azərbaycanlı gənclərlə müzakirə edilib FOTO
 Moskvada Baş Konsul, deputatlar və Azərbaycan diasporu referendumu müzakirə ediblər-FOTO 
 ГОЛОСУЕМ ЗА СВОЕ БУДУЩЕЕ
 Deputat: “Cəmiyyətimizdə varlılara qarşı küdurət və həsəd var”
 “MSK hər bir faktı ciddi araşdıracaq”
 Международные наблюдатели положительно оценили выборы в Санкт-Петербурге
 Pirallahı rayonunda seçici fəallığı yüksək qiymətləndirilib
 Deputat Rüfət Quliyev görüşdə Ukraynada azərbaycanlılara qarşı olan  diskriminasıya hallarından danışıb
 "Ukraynalı deputatlar belə hadisələrdən çox narahatdırlar"- Rüfət Quliyev
 "Azərbaycan mətbuatında soydaşlarımızın oğurlanması statistikası şişirdilir"
 DİN: Ukraynada azərbaycanlıların oğurlanması məsələsi şişirdilərək ictimaiyyətə təqdim olunur
 Ukraynadakı azərbaycanlıların problemləri müzakirə olunub
 "Ukraynada azərbaycanlıların oğurlanması məsələsi şişirdilir" - DİN 
 Deputat Rüfət Quliyev: Ukraynada yaşayan azərbaycanlıların təhlükəsizliyi üçün bütün tədbirlər görülür
 Millət vəkili Rüfət Quliyev Ukraynada azərbaycanlılara qarşı olan diskriminasıya hallarına etiraz edib
 Kiyevdə diaspor nümayəndələri toplandı
 DİN rəsmisi:"Ukraynada azərbaycanlıların oğurlanması məsələsi şişirdilir"
 Ukraynada yaşayan azərbaycanlıların vəziyyəti müzakirə edilib
 Rüfət Quliyev bu il də Bosco Conference-in açılışını edib - FOTO
 Rüfət Quliyev bu il də Bosco Conference-in açılışını edib-FOTO
 Millət vəkili Bosco Conference-in açılışını edib
 Deputat beynəlxalq konfransda ölkəmizdəki sabitlikdən danışdı
 Bakıda beynəlxalq konfrans keçirilir
 Rüfət Quliyev bu il də Bosco Conference-in açılışını edib
 Rüfət Quliyev bu il də Bosco Conference-in açılışını edib - FOTO
 Малое семейное предпринимательство в различных странах мира и Азербайджан
 Deputat: “Azərbaycan birinci devalvasiyanı şok formada keçirdi, indi isə…”
 “Ukraynadakı Azərbaycan diasporları arasında ziddiyyət var” - MÜSAHİBƏ
 Deputat: “İşgüzar insanlara həmişə yol açıqdır”
 İnvestorlar vergidən azad olundu - Prezident iş yerlərinin çoxalmasına yeni şans açdı
 Ərzaq qiymətlərində növbəti bahalaşma dalğası başlanır?
 “Bu artımın imkansız ailələrə zərbəsi dəyməyəcək” - Millət vəkili
 Universitet məzunlarından millət vəkilinə təşəkkür - Foto
 Taras Şevçenko adına Kiyev Milli Universitetinin məzunlarından açıqlama gəldi
 “Əmrahbank” susur… Palatada isə hələ fikirləşirlər? – TƏHLİL
 Millət vəkili Rüfət Quliyev televiziyaların fəaliyyətindən narazılığını bildirib
 Müğənnilər daha çox vergiyə cəlb olunsun- TƏKLİF
 Руфат Гулиев о повышении лимитов льготного потребления газа и электроэнергии
 Deputat: Tarif Şurasının yeni qərarı ölkə rəhbərliyinin aztəminatlı əhaliyə qayğısını göstərir
 Rüfət Quliyev: “Neftdən itirdiyimizdən də artıq gəlirlər əldə edəcəyik” – MÜSAHİBƏ
 Azərbaycan iqtisadi inkişaf modeli yeni bir mərhələyə qədəm qoyur
 Как в мире стимулируют переход на безналичные расчеты? 
 Deputat Rüfət Quliyev: “İctimai və humanitar fənlərin bütün universitetlərdə tədrisi zəruridir”
 Электронные деньги – миллион в кармане
 Deputat: "Azərbaycan 2016-cı ildə makroiqtisadi göstəriciləri planlaşdırılmış səviyyədə saxlaya bildi"
 Transparency International вновь дискредитирует Баку и Москву
 MM-in deputatı: Azərbaycan 2016-cı ildə makroiqtisadi göstəriciləri planlaşdırılmış səviyyədə saxlaya bildi
 Azərbaycan iqtisadiyyatı dayanıqlıdır, dinamikdir
 Millət vəkili Rüfət Quliyev “Gənclərin dostu” mükafatına layiq görüldü
 Нужны ли нам общественные науки? 
 Lənkəranda ötən ilin yekunları müzakirə edildi
 С чем связаны сообщения о дефиците сигарет в Баку?
 Nizami rayonunda 2016-cı ilin yekunları müzakirə olunub
 Xocalı faciəsi bəşəriyyətə qarşı cinayətdir
 “Bəzi məmurlar cənab Prezidentin bu fərmanından ibrət dərsi götürməlidir”
 Rüfət Quliyev: “Mehriban Əliyeva bir çox taleyüklü təşəbbüslərin müəllifi, xalqımızın sevimlisidir”
 Bakıda Ukrayna ilə Azərbaycan arasında diplomatik münasibətlərin 25 illiyi qeyd edilib
 Azərbaycan-Ukrayna parlamentlərarası əlaqələr daha da genişlənir
 Siqaret çəkənlərə qarşı qanunlar sərtləşdirilir
 Руфат Гулиев: Бренд «Made in Azerbaijan» обречен на успех за рубежом
 Руфат Гулиев: В стране созданы все условия для развития ненефтяного сектора
 Deputat Rüfət Quliyev: Neofaşizm və neonasizmi baş qaldırmağa qoymayaq
 InvestPro Азербайджан Баку 2017
 ИНКУБАТОР РЕФОРМ - Азербайджан улучшает бизнес-среду и инвестиционную привлекательность
 Руфат Гулиев: Азербайджан успешно выстраивает экономическую политику, направленную на развитие ненефтяного сектора
 В Азербайджане предложили запретить производство сигарет без фильтра и кальяны
 Азербайджан - ЕС: общие интересы с прицелом на продолжительное партнерство
 Millət vəkili Rüfət Quliyevin “Dünya iqtisadiyyatı və Azərbaycan” adlı kitabı işıq üzü gördü
 Сельское хозяйство остается одним из важных сегментов экономики Азербайджана
 Для развития табаководства в Азербайджане необходимо привлечь международных специалистов

"Trend" information agency:
 Azerbaijani election authority announces tentative parliamentary election results
 Opinion Way announces results of exit poll in Azerbaijan’s parliamentary election
 Results of exit poll in Azerbaijan’s polling stations announced
 Azerbaijani people’s interests outweighed economic aspects – MP
 Azerbaijani MPs to observe parliamentary election in Kazakhstan
 Azerbaijani MPs to observe parliamentary elections in Ukraine
 Moscow to host next meeting of Russian-Azerbaijani interparliamentary commission
 Azerbaijani parliament speaker to attend CIS PA meeting
 Delegation headed by Azerbaijani parliament’s speaker leaves for Almaty
 Azerbaijani speaker to participate in events to mark CIS PA anniversary
 Azerbaijani MPs to observe presidential elections in Russia
 Azerbaijani MPs to observe elections in Kazakhstan
 Azerbaijan to partake in meeting of Council of CIS Interparliamentary Assembly
 Azerbaijani parliamentary chairman to participate in CIS PA meeting (UPDATE)
 Personnel elected to Azerbaijani parliamentary committees (UPDATE)
 Central Election Commission of Azerbaijan announces preliminary results of parliamentary elections (UPDATE 4)
 Results of exit-poll in parliamentary elections in Azerbaijan disclosed (UPDATE 2) (PHOTO)
 Azerbaijani delegation to observe Kyrgyz parliamentary elections
 Program of Azerbaijani Parliament chairman’s visit to Italy announced
 Azerbaijani MPs  appraise presidential elections in Ukraine
 Members of the Azerbaijani parliament will make assessment of the presidential elections in Ukraine on Monday
 Ban of Smoking in Public Places May Reduce Cigarettes Sales by One-Third: Head of European Tobacco Baku
 Chairmanship in GUAM Parliamentary Assembly Transferred to Azerbaijan
 Results of exit poll held by PA Government Services
 Results of parliamentary elections in Azerbaijan on 11.00 a.m.
 Parlament seçkilərinin ilkin nəticələri (SİYAHI) (YENİLƏNİB)
 ABŞ-ın "AJF & Associates" şirkəti "exit-poll"un nəticələrini açıqladı (FOTO, SİYAHI) (ƏLAVƏ OLUNUB)
 ELS "exit-poll"un nəticələrini açıqladı (ƏLAVƏ OLUNUB) (SİYAHI)
 Azərbaycanda sahibkarlıq sahəsində yoxlamaları yalnız Baş Prokurorluq aparacaq
 Azərbaycan nümayəndə heyəti Belarusda prezident seçkilərini müşahidə edəcək
 Azərbaycanda 2016-cı ildə büdcə kəsirinin azalmasının 2 şərti
 Azərbaycanda dolların məzənnəsinin sabitləşəcəyi gözlənilmir
 Rüfət Quliyev: Avropa gələcəkdə Azərbaycanla münasibətlərdən daha çox fayda qazanacaq
 Deputat: Azərbaycan 5-7 ildən sonra neftdən asılı olmayacaq
 Moskvada Rusiya-Azərbaycan parlamentlərarası komissiyasının 13-cü iclası keçiriləcək
 Azərbaycan banklarını nə gözləyir?
 Millət vəkili: Azərbaycanda əhalinin kredit üzrə biliyini artırmaq lazımdır
 Oqtay Əsədovun rəhbərlik etdiyi nümayəndə heyəti Sankt-Peterburqa gedir
 Ukraynalı deputat: "Azərbaycandan çox şey öyrənmək əzmindəyik"
 Parlamentdə tələb: Azərbaycan telekanallarında çal-çağır, şou-biznes verilişləri bağlansın
 Azərbaycanda xarici siqaretlər bahalaşacaq
 Azərbaycanda siqaretin qiyməti ilə bağlı açıqlama
 "Rublun dəyərdən düşməsi Azərbaycanın Rusiya ilə ticarətini çətinləşdirir"
 MDB PA-da yollarda təhlükəsizlik məsələləri müzakirə ediləcək
 Azərbaycanda siqaretin bahalaşacağı gözlənilir
 Millət vəkili: MDB iqtisadi məkanı Azərbaycan üçün əsas yerdir
 Rüfət Quliyev: Yaxın 5-7 ildə Azərbaycan neft-qaz asılılığından tam xilas olacaq
 Qazaxıstanda parlamentin Yuxarı Palatasına seçkilər keçirilir
 Azərbaycanın millət vəkilləri Qazaxıstanda parlament seçkilərini izləyəcəklər
 Azərbaycan deputatları Ukraynada keçiriləcək parlament seçkilərini müşahidə edəcəklər
 Moskvada Rusiya-Azərbaycan parlamentlərarası komissiyasının 11-ci iclası keçiriləcək
 Milli qəhrəmanlara və onların ailə üzvlərinə yeni güzəştlər təklif olunur
 İtaliya-Azərbaycan münasibətləri müzakirə olunacaq
 Oqtay Əsədov MDB PA-nın iclasında iştirak edəcək
 Azərbaycan Parlamenti sədrinin başçılıq etdiyi nümayəndə heyəti Almatıya yola düşüb
 Milli Məclisin sədri MDB PA-nın 20 illik yubileyinə həsr olunmuş tədbirlərdə iştirak edəcək
 Azərbaycan deputatları Rusiyada keçiriləcək prezident seçkilərini müşahidə edəcəklər
 Azərbaycan deputatları Qazaxıstanda keçiriləcək parlament seçkilərini müşahidə edəcəklər
 Azərbaycan və Ukrayna gənclərinin birgə layihələr həyata keçirmələri müzakirə olunub (FOTO)
 Azərbaycan Parlamentinin deputatları Rusiya Dövlət Dumasına keçiriləcək seçkilərı müşahidə edəcəklər
 Spiker Oqtay Əsədovun rəhbərlik etdiyi nümayəndə heyəti MDB Parlamentlərarası Assambleya Şurasının iclasında iştirak edəcək
 Azərbaycan Parlamentinin sədri MDB PA-nın iclasında iştirak edəcək (ƏLAVƏ OLUNUB)
 Azərbaycan Parlamentinin komitələrinin tərkibi müəyyən olunub
 Azərbaycanda keçirilən parlament seçkisində "exit-poll"un nəticələri açıqlanıb (TAM SİYAHI ƏLAVƏ OLUNUB) (FOTO)
 Azərbaycan nümayəndə heyəti Qırğızıstanda Parlament seçkilərini müşahidə edəcək
 İyunun 3-də Milli Məclis sədrinin başçılıq etdiyi nümayəndə heyəti Rusiyaya rəsmi səfər edəcək
 Azərbaycan Parlamenti sədrinin İtaliyaya rəsmi səfəri başa çatıb
 Ukraynada "Qarabağ tarixin gərdişində" sənədli filminin təqdimatı olub (FOTO)
 Azərbaycan Parlamentinin deputatları Ukraynada prezident seçkiləri ilə bağlı təkrar səsvermə prosesini də müşahidə edəcəklər
 Azərbaycan Parlamenti deputatlarının Ukraynada keçirilən prezident seçkiləri ilə bağlı ilkin rəyi müsbət olub
 "European Tobacco Baku"nun rəhbəri: "İctimai yerlərdə siqaret çəkilməsinə qadağa qoyulması satışı 1/3 qədər azalda bilər"
 GUAM Parlament Assambleyasına sədrlik Azərbaycan tərəfinə verilib
 Amerikanın PA Government Services şirkətinin keçirdiyi exit poll –un yekunları açıqlanıb - cədvəl
 Seçkilərin nəticələri açıqlanıb
 Азербайджану нужна система контроля над выдачей кредитов
 Азербайджан повышает эффективность госуправления
 Малому бизнесу в Азербайджане будет предложена альтернатива льготным кредитам
 Инвестпривлекательность Азербайджана заключается в стабильной политической системе - депутат
 Выход Великобритании из ЕС не окажет глобального влияния на Азербайджан - эксперт
 Ukraynada yaşayan azərbaycanlıların vəziyyəti müzakirə edilib
 "Дорожная карта" позволит обеспечить равномерное и динамичное развитие экономики Азербайджана - депутат
 Азербайджан в 2016 г. смог сохранить макроэкономические показатели в планируемых рамках - депутат
 Инициированные Азербайджаном проекты превратят страну в газовую державу - эксперт
Европа приобрела в лице Азербайджана надежного партнера - эксперт

1963 births
Living people
Members of the National Assembly (Azerbaijan)